Pseudomeristomerinx is a genus of flies in the family Stratiomyidae.

Species
Pseudomeristomerinx flavimarginis Yang, Zhang & Li, 2014
Pseudomeristomerinx nigricornis Hollis, 1963
Pseudomeristomerinx nigromaculatus Yang, Zhang & Li, 2014
Pseudomeristomerinx nigroscutellus Yang, Zhang & Li, 2014

References

Stratiomyidae
Brachycera genera
Diptera of Asia